Sheefin is a townland in County Westmeath, Ireland.

Sheefin is one of 11 townlands of the civil parish of Taghmon in the barony of Corkaree in the Province of Leinster.

The neighbouring townlands are:Farrancallin to the north, Monkstown to the east, Knockatee to the south, Parsonstown to the south and west and Martinstown to the north–west.

In the 1911 census of Ireland there were 6 houses and 20 inhabitants in the townland.

References

External links
Map of Sheefin at openstreetmap.org
Sheefin at the IreAtlas Townland Data Base
Sheefin at Townlands.ie
Sheefin at The Placenames Database of Ireland

Townlands of County Westmeath